This page lists all described species of the spider family Araneidae as of Dec. 20, 2016, that start with the letter A.

Acacesia
Acacesia Simon, 1895
 Acacesia benigna Glueck, 1994 — Peru, Bolivia, Brazil
 Acacesia graciosa Lise & Braul, 1996 — Brazil
 Acacesia hamata (Hentz, 1847) (type species) — USA to Argentina
 Acacesia tenella (L. Koch, 1871) — Mexico to Brazil, French Guiana, Guyana
 Acacesia villalobosi Glueck, 1994 — Brazil
 Acacesia yacuiensis Glueck, 1994 — Brazil, Argentina

Acantharachne
Acantharachne Tullgren, 1910
 Acantharachne cornuta Tullgren, 1910 (type species) — East Africa
 Acantharachne giltayi Lessert, 1938 — Congo, Madagascar
 Acantharachne lesserti Giltay, 1930 — Congo
 Acantharachne madecassa Emerit, 2000 — Madagascar
 Acantharachne milloti Emerit, 2000 — Madagascar
 Acantharachne psyche Strand, 1913 — Central Africa
 Acantharachne regalis Hirst, 1925 — Cameroon, Congo
 Acantharachne seydeli Giltay, 1935 — Congo

Acanthepeira
Acanthepeira Marx, 1883
 Acanthepeira cherokee Levi, 1976 — USA
 Acanthepeira labidura (Mello-Leitao, 1943) — Brazil
 Acanthepeira marion Levi, 1976 — USA, Mexico
 Acanthepeira stellata (Walckenaer, 1805) (type species) — Canada to Mexico
 Acanthepeira venusta (Banks, 1896) — USA, Cuba, Hispaniola

Acroaspis
Acroaspis Karsch, 1878
 Acroaspis decorosa (Urquhart, 1894) — New Zealand
 Acroaspis olorina Karsch, 1878 (type species) — Western Australia, New South Wales
 Acroaspis tuberculifera Thorell, 1881 — Queensland

Acrosomoides
Acrosomoides Simon, 1887
 Acrosomoides acrosomoides (O. P.-Cambridge, 1879) — Madagascar
 Acrosomoides linnaei (Walckenaer, 1841) (type species) — West, Central, East Africa
 Acrosomoides tetraedrus (Walckenaer, 1841) — Cameroon, Congo

Actinacantha
Actinacantha Simon, 1864
 Actinacantha globulata (Walckenaer, 1841) — Sumatra, Java

Actinosoma
Actinosoma Holmberg, 1883
 Actinosoma pentacanthum (Walckenaer, 1841) — Colombia to Argentina

Aculepeira
Aculepeira Chamberlin & Ivie, 1942
 Aculepeira aculifera (O. P.-Cambridge, 1889) — USA to Guatemala
 Aculepeira albovittata (Mello-Leitao, 1941) — Paraguay, Argentina
 Aculepeira angeloi Álvares, Loyola & De Maria, 2005 — Brazil
 Aculepeira apa Levi, 1991 — Paraguay
 Aculepeira armida (Audouin, 1826) — Palearctic
 Aculepeira armida orientalis (Kulczynski, 1901) — Russia, China
 Aculepeira armida pumila (Simon, 1929) — France
 Aculepeira azul Levi, 1991 — Panama
 Aculepeira busu Levi, 1991 — Hispaniola
 Aculepeira carbonaria (L. Koch, 1869) — Palearctic
 Aculepeira carbonaria sinensis (Schenkel, 1953) — China
 Aculepeira carbonarioides (Keyserling, 1892) — USA, Canada, Alaska, Russia
 Aculepeira ceropegia (Walckenaer, 1802) — Palearctic
 Aculepeira escazu Levi, 1991 — Costa Rica
 Aculepeira gravabilis (O. P.-Cambridge, 1889) — Honduras to Panama
 Aculepeira lapponica (Holm, 1945) — Sweden, Finland, Russia
 Aculepeira luosangensis Yin et al., 1990 — China
 Aculepeira machu Levi, 1991 — Peru
 Aculepeira matsudae Tanikawa, 1994 — Japan
 Aculepeira morenoae Rubio, Izquierdo & Piacentini, 2013 — Argentina
 Aculepeira packardi (Thorell, 1875) (type species) — North America, Russia, China, Kazakhstan
 Aculepeira serpentina Guo & Zhang, 2010 — China
 Aculepeira taibaishanensis Zhu & Wang, 1995 — China
 Aculepeira talishia (Zawadsky, 1902) — Turkey, Russia, Georgia, Azerbaijan
 Aculepeira travassosi (Soares & Camargo, 1948) — Mexico to Argentina
 Aculepeira visite Levi, 1991 — Hispaniola
 Aculepeira vittata (Gerschman & Schiapelli, 1948) — Brazil, Paraguay, Argentina

Acusilas
Acusilas Simon, 1895
 Acusilas africanus Simon, 1895 — West, Central, East Africa
 Acusilas callidus Schmidt & Scharff, 2008 — Sulawesi
 Acusilas coccineus Simon, 1895 (type species) — China to Moluccas
 Acusilas dahoneus Barrion & Litsinger, 1995 — Philippines
 Acusilas lepidus (Thorell, 1898) — Myanmar
 Acusilas malaccensis Murphy & Murphy, 1983 — Thailand, Laos, Malaysia, Sumatra, Borneo
 Acusilas spiralis Schmidt & Scharff, 2008 — Sumatra
 Acusilas vei Schmidt & Scharff, 2008 — Sulawesi
 Acusilas vilei Schmidt & Scharff, 2008 — Sulawesi

Aethriscus
Aethriscus Pocock, 1902
 Aethriscus olivaceus Pocock, 1902 (type species) — Congo
 Aethriscus pani Lessert, 1930 — Congo

Aethrodiscus
Aethrodiscus Strand, 1913
 Aethrodiscus transversalis Strand, 1913 — Central Africa

Aetrocantha
Aetrocantha Karsch, 1879
 Aetrocantha falkensteini Karsch, 1879 — West, Central Africa

Afracantha
Afracantha Dahl, 1914
 Afracantha camerunensis (Thorell, 1899) — West, Central, East Africa, Venezuela

Agalenatea
Agalenatea Archer, 1951
 Agalenatea liriope (L. Koch, 1875) — Ethiopia, Yemen
 Agalenatea redii (Scopoli, 1763) (type species) — Palearctic

Alenatea
Alenatea Song & Zhu, 1999
 Alenatea fuscocolorata (Bösenberg & Strand, 1906) (type species) — China, Korea, Taiwan, Japan
 Alenatea touxie Song & Zhu, 1999 — China
 Alenatea wangi Zhu & Song, 1999 — China

Allocyclosa
Allocyclosa Levi, 1999
 Allocyclosa bifurca (McCook, 1887) — USA to Panama, Cuba, Hispaniola

Alpaida
Alpaida O. P.-Cambridge, 1889
 Alpaida acuta (Keyserling, 1865) — Panama to Argentina
 Alpaida albocincta (Mello-Leitao, 1945) — Venezuela to Argentina
 Alpaida almada Levi, 1988 — Brazil
 Alpaida alticeps (Keyserling, 1879) — Brazil, Paraguay
 Alpaida alto Levi, 1988 — Paraguay
 Alpaida alvarengai Levi, 1988 — Brazil
 Alpaida amambay Levi, 1988 — Colombia, Paraguay
 Alpaida anchicaya Levi, 1988 — Colombia
 Alpaida angra Levi, 1988 — Brazil
 Alpaida antonio Levi, 1988 — Brazil, Guyana
 Alpaida arvoredo Buckup & Rodrigues, 2011 — Brazil
 Alpaida atomaria (Simon, 1895) — Brazil
 Alpaida banos Levi, 1988 — Colombia, Ecuador
 Alpaida biasii Levi, 1988 — Brazil
 Alpaida bicornuta (Taczanowski, 1878) — Costa Rica to Argentina
 Alpaida bischoffi Levi, 1988 — Brazil
 Alpaida boa Levi, 1988 — Brazil
 Alpaida boraceia Levi, 1988 — Brazil
 Alpaida cachimbo Levi, 1988 — Brazil
 Alpaida cali Levi, 1988 — Colombia
 Alpaida calotypa (Chamberlin, 1916) — Peru
 Alpaida canela Levi, 1988 — Brazil
 Alpaida canoa Levi, 1988 — Brazil
 Alpaida caramba Buckup & Rodrigues, 2011 — Brazil
 Alpaida carminea (Taczanowski, 1878) — Peru, Brazil, Paraguay, Argentina
 Alpaida caxias Levi, 1988 — Brazil
 Alpaida chaco Levi, 1988 — Paraguay
 Alpaida championi (O. P.-Cambridge, 1889) — Guatemala to Colombia
 Alpaida chapada Levi, 1988 — Brazil
 Alpaida chickeringi Levi, 1988 — Panama to Brazil
 Alpaida cisneros Levi, 1988 — Colombia, Ecuador
 Alpaida citrina (Keyserling, 1892) — Brazil
 Alpaida clarindoi Nogueira & Dias, 2015 - Brazil 
 Alpaida conica O. P.-Cambridge, 1889 (type species) — Panama
 Alpaida constant Levi, 1988 — Brazil
 Alpaida coroico Levi, 1988 — Bolivia
 Alpaida costai Levi, 1988 — Argentina
 Alpaida cuiaba Levi, 1988 — Brazil
 Alpaida cuyabeno Levi, 1988 — Colombia, Ecuador
 Alpaida darlingtoni Levi, 1988 — Colombia
 Alpaida deborae Levi, 1988 — Brazil, Suriname, French Guiana
 Alpaida delicata (Keyserling, 1892) — Colombia, Peru, Bolivia, Brazil
 Alpaida dominica Levi, 1988 — Lesser Antilles
 Alpaida eberhardi Levi, 1988 — Colombia
 Alpaida elegantula (Archer, 1965) — Martinique
 Alpaida ericae Levi, 1988 — Brazil, Argentina
 Alpaida erythrothorax (Taczanowski, 1873) — French Guiana
 Alpaida gallardoi Levi, 1988 — Brazil, Paraguay, Argentina
 Alpaida gracia Levi, 1988 — Argentina
 Alpaida graphica (O. P.-Cambridge, 1889) — Mexico to Panama
 Alpaida grayi (Blackwall, 1863) — Brazil, Paraguay, Uruguay, Argentina
 Alpaida guimaraes Levi, 1988 — Brazil, Guyana
 Alpaida gurupi Levi, 1988 — Colombia, Brazil
 Alpaida guto Abrahim & Bonaldo, 2008 — Brazil
 Alpaida haligera (Archer, 1971) — Peru, Venezuela
 Alpaida hartliebi Levi, 1988 — Brazil
 Alpaida hoffmanni Levi, 1988 — Brazil, Paraguay
 Alpaida holmbergi Levi, 1988 — Argentina
 Alpaida iguazu Levi, 1988 — Brazil, Argentina
 Alpaida iquitos Levi, 1988 — Peru, Ecuador, Brazil
 Alpaida itacolomi Santos & Santos, 2010 — Brazil
 Alpaida itapua Levi, 1988 — Paraguay
 Alpaida itauba Levi, 1988 — Brazil, Argentina
 Alpaida jacaranda Levi, 1988 — Brazil
 Alpaida kartabo Levi, 1988 — Guyana
 Alpaida keyserlingi Levi, 1988 — Brazil
 Alpaida kochalkai Levi, 1988 — Colombia
 Alpaida lanei Levi, 1988 — Brazil, Argentina
 Alpaida latro (Fabricius, 1775) — Brazil, Uruguay, Paraguay, Argentina
 Alpaida leucogramma (White, 1841) — Panama to Argentina
 Alpaida levii Saturnino, Rodrigues & Bonaldo, 2015 - Brazil 
 Alpaida lomba Levi, 1988 — Brazil
 Alpaida losamigos Deza & Andía, 2014 -  Peru 
 Alpaida lubinae Levi, 1988 — Venezuela
 Alpaida machala Levi, 1988 — Ecuador
 Alpaida madeira Levi, 1988 — Brazil
 Alpaida manicata Levi, 1988 — Colombia, Brazil
 Alpaida marmorata (Taczanowski, 1873) — Ecuador, Peru, French Guiana
 Alpaida marta Levi, 1988 — Colombia
 Alpaida mato Levi, 1988 — Brazil
 Alpaida moata (Chamberlin & Ivie, 1936) — Panama, Colombia
 Alpaida moka Levi, 1988 — Bolivia
 Alpaida monzon Levi, 1988 — Peru
 Alpaida monzon audiberti Dierkens, 2014 -  French Guiana 
 Alpaida morro Levi, 1988 — Brazil
 Alpaida muco Levi, 1988 — Colombia
 Alpaida murtinho Levi, 1988 — Brazil
 Alpaida nadleri Levi, 1988 — Venezuela
 Alpaida nancho Levi, 1988 — Peru
 Alpaida narino Levi, 1988 — Colombia
 Alpaida natal Levi, 1988 — Brazil
 Alpaida navicula (L. Koch, 1871) — Brazil
 Alpaida negro Levi, 1988 — Colombia, Brazil
 Alpaida nigrofrenata (Simon, 1895) — Brazil
 Alpaida niveosigillata (Mello-Leitao, 1941) — Colombia, Ecuador
 Alpaida nonoai Levi, 1988 — Brazil
 Alpaida octolobata Levi, 1988 — Brazil, Argentina
 Alpaida oliverioi (Soares & Camargo, 1948) — Brazil
 Alpaida orgaos Levi, 1988 — Brazil
 Alpaida oyapockensis Dierkens, 2014 - French Guiana 
 Alpaida pedro Levi, 1988 — Brazil
 Alpaida penca Deza & Andía, 2014 -  Peru 
 Alpaida picchu Levi, 1988 — Peru
 Alpaida quadrilorata (Simon, 1897) — Brazil, Paraguay, Uruguay, Argentina
 Alpaida queremal Levi, 1988 — Colombia
 Alpaida rioja Levi, 1988 — Brazil, Argentina
 Alpaida rosa Levi, 1988 — Brazil, Argentina
 Alpaida rossi Levi, 1988 — Peru
 Alpaida rostratula (Keyserling, 1892) — Brazil, Argentina
 Alpaida rubellula (Keyserling, 1892) — Brazil, Paraguay, Argentina
 Alpaida sandrei (Simon, 1895) — Brazil
 Alpaida santosi Levi, 1988 — Brazil
 Alpaida schneblei Levi, 1988 — Colombia
 Alpaida scriba (Mello-Leitao, 1940) — Brazil
 Alpaida septemmammata (O. P.-Cambridge, 1889) — Mexico to Argentina
 Alpaida sevilla Levi, 1988 — Colombia
 Alpaida silencio Levi, 1988 — Colombia
 Alpaida simla Levi, 1988 — Trinidad
 Alpaida sobradinho Levi, 1988 — Brazil
 Alpaida sulphurea (Taczanowski, 1873) — French Guiana
 Alpaida sumare Levi, 1988 — Brazil
 Alpaida tabula (Simon, 1895) — Guyana to Bolivia
 Alpaida tayos Levi, 1988 — Ecuador, Peru, Brazil, Guyana
 Alpaida teresinha Braga-Pereira & Santos, 2013 — Brazil
 Alpaida thaxteri Levi, 1988 — Trinidad
 Alpaida tijuca Levi, 1988 — Brazil
 Alpaida toninho Braga-Pereira & Santos, 2013 — Brazil
 Alpaida tonze Santos & Santos, 2010 — Brazil
 Alpaida trilineata (Taczanowski, 1878) — Peru
 Alpaida trispinosa (Keyserling, 1892) — Panama to Argentina
 Alpaida truncata (Keyserling, 1865) — Mexico to Argentina
 Alpaida truncata obscura (Caporiacco, 1948) — Guyana
 Alpaida truncata sexmaculata (Caporiacco, 1948) — Guyana
 Alpaida tullgreni (Caporiacco, 1955) — Venezuela
 Alpaida tuonabo (Chamberlin & Ivie, 1936) — Panama
 Alpaida urucuca Levi, 1988 — Brazil
 Alpaida utcuyacu Levi, 1988 — Peru
 Alpaida utiariti Levi, 1988 — Brazil
 Alpaida vanzolinii Levi, 1988 — Peru, Brazil, Argentina
 Alpaida variabilis (Keyserling, 1864) — Colombia
 Alpaida venger Castanheira & Baptista, 2015 - Brazil 
 Alpaida veniliae (Keyserling, 1865) — Panama to Argentina
 Alpaida vera Levi, 1988 — Brazil
 Alpaida versicolor (Keyserling, 1877) — Brazil, Paraguay, Uruguay, Argentina
 Alpaida wenzeli (Simon, 1897) — St. Vincent
 Alpaida weyrauchi Levi, 1988 — Peru
 Alpaida yanayacu Saturnino, Rodrigues & Bonaldo, 2015 - Brazil 
 Alpaida yotoco Levi, 1988 — Colombia
 Alpaida yucuma Levi, 1988 — Brazil
 Alpaida yungas Levi, 1988 — Bolivia
 Alpaida yuto Levi, 1988 — Paraguay, Argentina

Amazonepeira
Amazonepeira Levi, 1989
 Amazonepeira beno Levi, 1994 — Ecuador, Brazil, Suriname
 Amazonepeira callaria (Levi, 1991) — Peru, Bolivia, Brazil
 Amazonepeira herrera Levi, 1989 (type species) — Peru, Brazil
 Amazonepeira manaus Levi, 1994 — Brazil
 Amazonepeira masaka Levi, 1994 — Ecuador, Brazil

Anepsion
Anepsion Strand, 1929
 Anepsion buchi Chrysanthus, 1969 — New Guinea, Solomon Islands
 Anepsion depressum (Thorell, 1877) — China, Myanmar to Sulawesi
 Anepsion depressum birmanicum (Thorell, 1895) — Myanmar
 Anepsion fuscolimbatum (Simon, 1901) — Malaysia
 Anepsion hammeni Chrysanthus, 1969 — New Guinea
 Anepsion jacobsoni Chrysanthus, 1961 — Indonesia
 Anepsion japonicum (Bösenberg & Strand, 1906) — China, Japan
 Anepsion maculatum (Thorell, 1897) — Myanmar
 Anepsion maritatum (O. P.-Cambridge, 1877) — Sri Lanka, China to Sulawesi
 Anepsion peltoides (Thorell, 1878) — Australia, New Guinea, Bismarck Archipel
 Anepsion reimoseri Chrysanthus, 1961 — New Guinea
 Anepsion rhomboides (L. Koch, 1867) (type species) — Samoa
 Anepsion roeweri Chrysanthus, 1961 — Taiwan, Philippines, Riouw Islands
 Anepsion semialbum (Simon, 1880) — New Caledonia
 Anepsion villosum (Thorell, 1877) — Sulawesi
 Anepsion wichmanni (Kulczynski, 1911) — New Guinea
 Anepsion wolffi Chrysanthus, 1969 — Solomon Islands

Arachnura
Arachnura Vinson, 1863
 Arachnura angura Tikader, 1970 — India
 Arachnura caudatella Roewer, 1942 — New Guinea, Queensland
 Arachnura feredayi (L. Koch, 1872) — Australia, Tasmania, New Zealand
 Arachnura heptotubercula Yin, Hu & Wang, 1983 — China
 Arachnura higginsi (L. Koch, 1872) — Australia, Tasmania
 Arachnura logio Yaginuma, 1956 — China, Korea, Japan
 Arachnura melanura Simon, 1867 — India to Japan and Sulawesi
 Arachnura perfissa (Thorell, 1895) — Myanmar
 Arachnura pygmaea (Thorell, 1890) — Nias Islands
 Arachnura quinqueapicata Strand, 1911 — Aru Islands
 Arachnura scorpionoides Vinson, 1863 (type species) — Congo, Ethiopia, Madagascar, Mauritius, Seychelles
 Arachnura simoni Berland, 1924 — New Caledonia
 Arachnura spinosa (Saito, 1933) — Taiwan

Araneus
Araneus Clerck, 1757
 Araneus aballensis (Strand, 1906) — Ethiopia
 Araneus abeicus Levi, 1991 — Brazil
 Araneus abigeatus Levi, 1975 — USA
 Araneus acachmenus Rainbow, 1916 — Queensland
 Araneus acolla Levi, 1991 — Peru
 Araneus acrocephalus (Thorell, 1887) — Myanmar
 Araneus acronotus (Grube, 1861) — Russia
 Araneus acropygus (Thorell, 1877) — Sulawesi
 Araneus acuminatus (L. Koch, 1872) — Queensland, Solomon Islands
 Araneus acusisetus Zhu & Song, 1994 — China, Korea, Japan
 Araneus adiantiformis Caporiacco, 1941 — Ethiopia
 Araneus adjuntaensis (Petrunkevitch, 1930) — Puerto Rico
 Araneus aethiopicus (Roewer, 1961) — Senegal
 Araneus aethiopissa Simon, 1907 — Senegal, Bioko
 Araneus affinis Zhu, Tu & Hu, 1988 — China
 Araneus agastus Rainbow, 1916 — Queensland
 Araneus akakensis (Strand, 1906) — Ethiopia
 Araneus aksuensis Yin, Xie & Bao, 1996 — China
 Araneus albabdominalis Zhu et al., 2005 — China
 Araneus albiaculeis (Strand, 1906) — Ethiopia
 Araneus albidus (L. Koch, 1871) — Queensland
 Araneus albilunatus Roewer, 1961 — Senegal
 Araneus albomaculatus Yin et al., 1990 — China
 Araneus alboquadratus Dyal, 1935 — Pakistan
 Araneus albotriangulus (Keyserling, 1887) — Queensland, New South Wales
 Araneus alboventris (Emerton, 1884) — USA
 Araneus alhue Levi, 1991 — Chile, Argentina
 Araneus allani Levi, 1973 — USA
 Araneus alsine (Walckenaer, 1802) — Palearctic
 Araneus altitudinum Caporiacco, 1934 — Karakorum
 Araneus amabilis Tanikawa, 2001 — Japan
 Araneus amblycyphus Simon, 1908 — Western Australia
 Araneus amygdalaceus (Keyserling, 1864) — Mauritius
 Araneus ana Levi, 1991 — Costa Rica
 Araneus anantnagensis Tikader & Bal, 1981 — India
 Araneus anaspastus (Thorell, 1892) — Singapore
 Araneus anatipes (Keyserling, 1887) — Queensland
 Araneus ancurus Zhu, Tu & Hu, 1988 — China
 Araneus andrewsi (Archer, 1951) — USA
 Araneus anguinifer (F. O. P.-Cambridge, 1904) — Mexico, Costa Rica
 Araneus angulatus Clerck, 1757 (type species) — Palearctic
 Araneus angulatus personatus Simon, 1929 — Belgium, France
 Araneus anjonensis Schenkel, 1963 — China
 Araneus annuliger (Thorell, 1898) — Myanmar
 Araneus annulipes (Lucas, 1838) — Canary Islands
 Araneus apache Levi, 1975 — USA
 Araneus apicalis (Thorell, 1899) — Cameroon
 Araneus apiculatus (Thorell, 1895) — Myanmar
 Araneus apobleptus Rainbow, 1916 — Queensland
 Araneus appendiculatus (Taczanowski, 1873) — French Guiana
 Araneus apricus (Karsch, 1884) — Africa, Sao Tome, Yemen, Socotra
 Araneus aragua Levi, 2008 — Venezuela
 Araneus aralis Bakhvalov, 1981 — Kyrgyzstan
 Araneus arenaceus (Keyserling, 1886) — Queensland, New South Wales
 Araneus arfakianus (Thorell, 1881) — New Guinea
 Araneus arganicola Simon, 1909 — Morocco
 Araneus argentarius Rainbow, 1916 — Queensland
 Araneus arizonensis (Banks, 1900) — USA, Mexico
 Araneus asiaticus Bakhvalov, 1983 — Kyrgyzstan
 Araneus aubertorum Berland, 1938 — New Hebrides
 Araneus aurantiifemuris (Mello-Leitao, 1942) — Argentina
 Araneus auriculatus Song & Zhu, 1992 — China
 Araneus axacus Levi, 1991 — Mexico
 Araneus badiofoliatus Schenkel, 1963 — China
 Araneus badongensis Song & Zhu, 1992 — China
 Araneus bagamoyensis (Strand, 1906) — East Africa
 Araneus baicalicus Bakhvalov, 1981 — Russia
 Araneus balanus (Doleschall, 1859) — Amboina
 Araneus bandelieri (Simon, 1891) — Venezuela, Brazil
 Araneus bantaengi Merian, 1911 — Sulawesi
 Araneus bargusinus Bakhvalov, 1981 — Russia
 Araneus basalteus Schenkel, 1936 — China
 Araneus bastarensis Gajbe, 2005 — India
 Araneus baul Levi, 1991 — Mexico
 Araneus beebei Petrunkevitch, 1914 — Myanmar
 Araneus beijiangensis Hu & Wu, 1989 — China
 Araneus biapicatifer (Strand, 1907) — Australia
 Araneus bicavus Zhu & Wang, 1994 — China
 Araneus bicentenarius (McCook, 1888) — USA, Canada
 Araneus bigibbosus (O. P.-Cambridge, 1885) — Yarkand
 Araneus bihamulus Zhu et al., 2005 — China
 Araneus bilunifer Pocock, 1900 — India
 Araneus bimaculicollis Hu, 2001 — China
 Araneus bimini Levi, 1991 — Bahama Islands
 Araneus biprominens Yin, Wang & Xie, 1989 — China
 Araneus bipunctatus (Thorell, 1898) — Myanmar
 Araneus bipunctatus Franganillo, 1931 — Cuba
 Araneus bispinosus (Keyserling, 1885) — USA
 Araneus bivittatus (Walckenaer, 1841) — USA
 Araneus blaisei Simon, 1909 — Vietnam
 Araneus blochmanni (Strand, 1907) — Java
 Araneus blumenau Levi, 1991 — Brazil, Uruguay, Argentina
 Araneus boerneri (Strand, 1907) — India
 Araneus boerneri clavimaculus (Strand, 1907) — India
 Araneus boerneri obscurellus (Strand, 1907) — India
 Araneus boesenbergi (Fox, 1938) — China
 Araneus bogotensis (Keyserling, 1864) — Colombia to Bolivia and Brazil
 Araneus boneti Levi, 1991 — Mexico
 Araneus bonsallae (McCook, 1894) — USA
 Araneus borealis Tanikawa, 2001 — Japan
 Araneus boreus Uyemura & Yaginuma, 1972 — Japan
 Araneus bosmani Simon, 1903 — Equatorial Guinea
 Araneus braueri (Strand, 1906) — Ethiopia
 Araneus brisbanae (L. Koch, 1867) — New Guinea, Australia
 Araneus bryantae Brignoli, 1983 — Hispaniola
 Araneus bufo (Denis, 1941) — Canary Islands
 Araneus caballo Levi, 1991 — Mexico
 Araneus calusa Levi, 1973 — USA
 Araneus camilla (Simon, 1889) — India, Pakistan
 Araneus canacus Berland, 1931 — New Caledonia
 Araneus canalae Berland, 1924 — New Caledonia
 Araneus caplandensis (Strand, 1907) — South Africa
 Araneus carabellus (Strand, 1913) — Central Africa
 Araneus carchi Levi, 1991 — Ecuador
 Araneus cardioceros Pocock, 1899 — Socotra
 Araneus carimagua Levi, 1991 — Colombia
 Araneus carnifex (O. P.-Cambridge, 1885) — Yarkand
 Araneus carroll Levi, 1973 — USA
 Araneus castilho Levi, 1991 — Brazil
 Araneus catillatus (Thorell, 1895) — Myanmar
 Araneus catospilotus Simon, 1907 — Guinea-Bissau, Principe, Congo
 Araneus caudifer Kulczynski, 1911 — New Guinea
 Araneus cavaticus (Keyserling, 1881) — USA, Canada
 Araneus celebensis Merian, 1911 — Sulawesi
 Araneus cercidius Yin et al., 1990 — China
 Araneus cereolus (Simon, 1886) — Senegal, Cameroon, Ethiopia
 Araneus chiapas Levi, 1991 — Mexico
 Araneus chiaramontei Caporiacco, 1940 — Ethiopia
 Araneus chingaza Levi, 1991 — Colombia
 Araneus chunhuaia Zhu, Tu & Hu, 1988 — China
 Araneus chunlin Yin et al., 2009 — China
 Araneus cingulatus (Walckenaer, 1841) — USA
 Araneus circe (Audouin, 1826) — Palearctic
 Araneus circellus Song & Zhu, 1992 — China
 Araneus circulissparsus (Keyserling, 1887) — New South Wales
 Araneus circumbasilaris Yin et al., 1990 — China
 Araneus coccinella Pocock, 1898 — South Africa
 Araneus cochise Levi, 1973 — USA
 Araneus cohnae Levi, 1991 — Brazil
 Araneus colima Levi, 1991 — Mexico
 Araneus colubrinus Song & Zhu, 1992 — China
 Araneus compsus (Soares & Camargo, 1948) — Brazil
 Araneus comptus Rainbow, 1916 — Queensland
 Araneus comptus fuscocapitatus Rainbow, 1916 — Queensland
 Araneus concepcion Levi, 1991 — Chile
 Araneus concoloratus (F. O. P.-Cambridge, 1904) — Panama
 Araneus corbita (L. Koch, 1871) — Samoa
 Araneus corporosus (Keyserling, 1892) — Brazil, Argentina
 Araneus corticaloides (Roewer, 1955) — Corsica
 Araneus corticarius (Emerton, 1884) — USA, Canada, Alaska
 Araneus crinitus (Rainbow, 1893) — New South Wales
 Araneus crispulus Tullgren, 1952 — Sweden
 Araneus cristobal Levi, 1991 — Mexico
 Araneus cuiaba Levi, 1991 — Brazil, Argentina
 Araneus cyclops Caporiacco, 1940 — Ethiopia
 Araneus cyrtarachnoides (Keyserling, 1887) — New Guinea to New South Wales
 Araneus daozhenensis Zhu et al., 2005 — China
 Araneus dayongensis Yin et al., 1990 — China
 Araneus decaisnei (Lucas, 1863) — Philippines
 Araneus decentellus (Strand, 1907) — India, China
 Araneus decolor (L. Koch, 1871) — New South Wales, Victoria, Fiji
 Araneus decoratus (Thorell, 1899) — Cameroon
 Araneus demoniacus Caporiacco, 1939 — Ethiopia
 Araneus depressatulus (Roewer, 1942) — New Guinea
 Araneus desierto Levi, 1991 — Mexico
 Araneus detrimentosus (O. P.-Cambridge, 1889) — USA to Colombia
 Araneus diabrosis (Walckenaer, 1841) — New South Wales
 Araneus diadematoides Zhu, Tu & Hu, 1988 — China
 Araneus diadematus Clerck, 1757 — Holarctic
 Araneus dianiphus Rainbow, 1916 — Queensland
 Araneus dianiphus xanthostichus Rainbow, 1916 — Queensland
 Araneus diffinis Zhu, Tu & Hu, 1988 — China
 Araneus dimidiatus (L. Koch, 1871) — Queensland, New South Wales
 Araneus diversicolor (Rainbow, 1893) — New South Wales
 Araneus doenitzellus (Strand, 1906) — Japan
 Araneus dofleini (Bösenberg & Strand, 1906) — Japan
 Araneus dospinolongus Barrion & Litsinger, 1995 — Philippines
 Araneus dreisbachi Levi, 1991 — Mexico
 Araneus drygalskii (Strand, 1909) — South Africa
 Araneus ealensis Giltay, 1935 — Congo
 Araneus eburneiventris (Simon, 1908) — Western Australia
 Araneus ejusmodi Bösenberg & Strand, 1906 — China, Korea, Japan
 Araneus elatatus (Strand, 1911) — Aru Islands, Kei Islands
 Araneus elizabethae Levi, 1991 — Hispaniola
 Araneus ellipticus (Tikader & Bal, 1981) — Bangladesh, India, China, Laos
 Araneus elongatus Yin, Wang & Xie, 1989 — China
 Araneus emmae Simon, 1900 — Hawaii
 Araneus enucleatus (Karsch, 1879) — India, Sri Lanka, Myanmar, Sumatra
 Araneus enyoides (Thorell, 1877) — Sulawesi
 Araneus excavatus Franganillo, 1930 — Cuba
 Araneus expletus (O. P.-Cambridge, 1889) — Mexico to Panama
 Araneus exsertus Rainbow, 1904 — Australia
 Araneus falcatus Guo, Zhang & Zhu, 2011 — China
 Araneus fastidiosus (Keyserling, 1887) — Queensland
 Araneus favorabilis Rainbow, 1916 — Queensland
 Araneus faxoni (Bryant, 1940) — Cuba
 Araneus fengshanensis Zhu & Song, 1994 — China
 Araneus ferganicus Bakhvalov, 1983 — Kyrgyzstan
 Araneus ferrugineus (Thorell, 1877) — Sulawesi
 Araneus fictus (Rainbow, 1896) — Queensland
 Araneus finneganae Berland, 1938 — New Hebrides
 Araneus fishoekensis (Strand, 1909) — South Africa
 Araneus fistulosus Franganillo, 1930 — Cuba
 Araneus flagelliformis Zhu & Yin, 1998 — China
 Araneus flavisternis (Thorell, 1878) — Amboina, New Guinea
 Araneus flavisternis momiensis (Thorell, 1881) — New Guinea
 Araneus flavopunctatus (L. Koch, 1871) — Fiji
 Araneus flavosellatus Simon, 1895 — Brazil
 Araneus flavosignatus (Roewer, 1942) — Sulawesi
 Araneus flavus (O. P.-Cambridge, 1894) — Mexico to Nicaragua
 Araneus floriatus Hogg, 1914 — New Guinea
 Araneus formosellus (Roewer, 1942) — Pakistan
 Araneus frio Levi, 1991 — Mexico
 Araneus fronki Levi, 1991 — Brazil
 Araneus frosti (Hogg, 1896) — Central Australia
 Araneus fulvellus (Roewer, 1942) — India, Pakistan
 Araneus fuscinotus (Strand, 1908) — East Africa
 Araneus gadus Levi, 1973 — USA
 Araneus galero Levi, 1991 — Panama, Colombia
 Araneus gazerti (Strand, 1909) — South Africa
 Araneus geminatus (Thorell, 1881) — New Guinea
 Araneus gemma (McCook, 1888) — USA, Canada, Alaska
 Araneus gemmoides Chamberlin & Ivie, 1935 — USA, Canada
 Araneus gerais Levi, 1991 — Brazil
 Araneus gestrellus (Strand, 1907) — Moluccas
 Araneus gestroi (Thorell, 1881) — New Guinea
 Araneus gibber (O. P.-Cambridge, 1885) — Yarkand
 Araneus ginninderranus Dondale, 1966 — Australian Capital Territory
 Araneus goniaeoides (Strand, 1915) — Lombok
 Araneus goniaeus (Thorell, 1878) — Myanmar, Java, Amboina, New Guinea
 Araneus goniaeus virens (Thorell, 1890) — Sumatra
 Araneus graemii Pocock, 1900 — South Africa
 Araneus granadensis (Keyserling, 1864) — Venezuela to Peru
 Araneus granti Hogg, 1914 — New Guinea
 Araneus gratiolus Yin et al., 1990 — China
 Araneus groenlandicola (Strand, 1906) — USA, Canada, Greenland
 Araneus grossus (C. L. Koch, 1844) — Europe to Central Asia
 Araneus guandishanensis Zhu, Tu & Hu, 1988 — China
 Araneus guatemus Levi, 1991 — Guatemala
 Araneus guerrerensis Chamberlin & Ivie, 1936 — USA, Mexico
 Araneus guessfeldi (Karsch, 1879) — West Africa
 Araneus gundlachi (Banks, 1914) — Cuba
 Araneus gurdus (O. P.-Cambridge, 1885) — Tibet
 Araneus guttatus (Keyserling, 1865) — Costa Rica to Argentina
 Araneus guttulatus (Walckenaer, 1841) — USA, Canada
 Araneus habilis (O. P.-Cambridge, 1889) — Mexico to Guatemala
 Araneus haematomerus (Gerstäcker, 1873) — Central Africa
 Araneus hamiltoni (Rainbow, 1893) — New South Wales
 Araneus hampei Simon, 1895 — Java
 Araneus haploscapellus (Strand, 1907) — South Africa
 Araneus haruspex (O. P.-Cambridge, 1885) — Tibet
 Araneus herbeus (Thorell, 1890) — Sumatra
 Araneus hierographicus Simon, 1909 — Vietnam
 Araneus himalayanus (Simon, 1889) — India
 Araneus hirsti Lessert, 1915 — East Africa
 Araneus hirsutulus (Stoliczka, 1869) — India
 Araneus hispaniola (Bryant, 1945) — Hispaniola
 Araneus holzapfelae Lessert, 1936 — Mozambique
 Araneus horizonte Levi, 1991 — Colombia to Paraguay
 Araneus hortensis (Blackwall, 1859) — Madeira
 Araneus hoshi Tanikawa, 2001 — Japan
 Araneus hotteiensis (Bryant, 1945) — Hispaniola
 Araneus huahun Levi, 1991 — Chile, Argentina
 Araneus hui Hu, 2001 — China
 Araneus huixtla Levi, 1991 — Mexico
 Araneus humilis (L. Koch, 1867) — Queensland
 Araneus idoneus (Keyserling, 1887) — Queensland
 Araneus iguacu Levi, 1991 — Brazil, Argentina
 Araneus illaudatus (Gertsch & Mulaik, 1936) — USA
 Araneus indistinctus (Doleschall, 1859) — Java
 Araneus inquietus (Keyserling, 1887) — New South Wales
 Araneus interjectus (L. Koch, 1871) — Queensland
 Araneus inustus (L. Koch, 1871) — Taiwan, Sumatra to Australia
 Araneus iriomotensis Tanikawa, 2001 — Japan
 Araneus isabella (Vinson, 1863) — Madagascar
 Araneus ishisawai Kishida, 1920 — Russia, Korea, Japan
 Araneus iviei (Archer, 1951) — USA, Canada
 Araneus jalisco Levi, 1991 — Mexico
 Araneus jamundi Levi, 1991 — Colombia
 Araneus juniperi (Emerton, 1884) — USA, Canada
 Araneus kalaharensis Simon, 1910 — Southern Africa
 Araneus kapiolaniae Simon, 1900 — Hawaii
 Araneus karissimbicus (Strand, 1913) — Central Africa
 Araneus kerr Levi, 1981 — USA
 Araneus kirgisikus Bakhvalov, 1974 — Kyrgyzstan
 Araneus kiwuanus (Strand, 1913) — Central Africa
 Araneus klaptoczi Simon, 1908 — Libya
 Araneus koepckeorum Levi, 1991 — Peru
 Araneus komi Tanikawa, 2001 — Japan
 Araneus kraepelini (Lenz, 1891) — Madagascar
 Araneus lacrymosus (Walckenaer, 1841) — New South Wales
 Araneus ladschicola (Strand, 1906) — Ethiopia
 Araneus lamperti (Strand, 1907) — South Africa
 Araneus lancearius (Keyserling, 1887) — New South Wales
 Araneus lanio Levi, 1991 — Mexico
 Araneus lateriguttatus (Karsch, 1879) — West Africa
 Araneus lathyrinus (Holmberg, 1875) — Brazil, Paraguay, Argentina
 Araneus latirostris (Thorell, 1895) — Myanmar
 Araneus leai (Rainbow, 1894) — New South Wales
 Araneus lechugalensis (Keyserling, 1883) — Peru
 Araneus legonensis Grasshoff & Edmunds, 1979 — Ghana
 Araneus lenkoi Levi, 1991 — Brazil
 Araneus lenzi (Roewer, 1942) — Madagascar
 Araneus leones Levi, 1991 — Mexico
 Araneus liae Yin et al., 2009 — China
 Araneus liber (Leardi, 1902) — India
 Araneus liberalis Rainbow, 1902 — New South Wales
 Araneus liberiae (Strand, 1906) — Liberia
 Araneus licenti Schenkel, 1953 — China
 Araneus lineatipes (O. P.-Cambridge, 1889) — Mexico to Honduras
 Araneus lineatus Franganillo, 1931 — Cuba
 Araneus linshuensis Yin et al., 1990 — China
 Araneus lintatus Levi, 1991 — Peru
 Araneus linzhiensis Hu, 2001 — China
 Araneus lithyphantiformis (Kishida, 1910) — Japan
 Araneus lixicolor (Thorell, 1895) — Myanmar
 Araneus loczyanus (Lendl, 1898) — Hong Kong
 Araneus lodicula (Keyserling, 1887) — New South Wales
 Araneus longicaudus (Thorell, 1877) — Sulawesi
 Araneus luteofaciens (Roewer, 1942) — Cameroon
 Araneus lutulentus (Keyserling, 1886) — Queensland
 Araneus macacus Uyemura, 1961 — Japan
 Araneus macleayi (Bradley, 1876) — New Guinea, Queensland
 Araneus madagascaricus (Strand, 1908) — Madagascar
 Araneus mamillanus (Keyserling, 1887) — New South Wales
 Araneus mammatus (Archer, 1951) — USA
 Araneus mangarevoides (Bösenberg & Strand, 1906) — Japan, China
 Araneus margaritae Caporiacco, 1940 — Ethiopia
 Araneus margitae (Strand, 1917) — Madagascar
 Araneus mariposa Levi, 1973 — USA
 Araneus marmoreus Clerck, 1757 — Holarctic
 Araneus marmoroides Schenkel, 1953 — China
 Araneus masculus Caporiacco, 1941 — Ethiopia
 Araneus masoni (Simon, 1887) — Myanmar
 Araneus mastersi (Bradley, 1876) — Australia
 Araneus matogrosso Levi, 1991 — Brazil
 Araneus mauensis Caporiacco, 1949 — Kenya
 Araneus mauensis ocellatus Caporiacco, 1949 — Kenya
 Araneus mayumiae Tanikawa, 2001 — Japan
 Araneus mazamitla Levi, 1991 — Mexico
 Araneus mbogaensis (Strand, 1913) — Central Africa
 Araneus memoryi Hogg, 1900 — Victoria
 Araneus mendoza Levi, 1991 — Mexico
 Araneus menglunensis Yin et al., 1990 — China
 Araneus meropes (Keyserling, 1865) — Colombia to Argentina
 Araneus mertoni (Strand, 1911) — Kei Islands
 Araneus metalis (Thorell, 1887) — Myanmar
 Araneus metellus (Strand, 1907) — China
 Araneus meus (Strand, 1907) — South Africa
 Araneus miami Levi, 1973 — USA
 Araneus microsoma (Banks, 1909) — Costa Rica
 Araneus microtuberculatus Petrunkevitch, 1914 — Myanmar
 Araneus mimosicola (Simon, 1884) — Sudan
 Araneus minahassae Merian, 1911 — Sulawesi
 Araneus miniatus (Walckenaer, 1841) — USA
 Araneus minutalis (Simon, 1889) — India
 Araneus miquanensis Yin et al., 1990 — China
 Araneus missouri Levi, 2008 — USA
 Araneus mitificus (Simon, 1886) — India to Philippines, New Guinea
 Araneus monica Levi, 1973 — USA
 Araneus monoceros (Thorell, 1895) — Myanmar
 Araneus montereyensis (Archer, 1951) — North America
 Araneus moretonae Levi, 1991 — Peru
 Araneus mortoni (Urquhart, 1891) — Tasmania
 Araneus morulus (Thorell, 1898) — Myanmar
 Araneus mossambicanus (Pavesi, 1881) — Mozambique
 Araneus motuoensis Yin et al., 1990 — China
 Araneus mulierarius (Keyserling, 1887) — Queensland
 Araneus musawas Levi, 1991 — Nicaragua
 Araneus myurus (Thorell, 1877) — Sulawesi
 Araneus nacional Levi, 1991 — Mexico
 Araneus nashoba Levi, 1973 — USA
 Araneus necopinus (Keyserling, 1887) — Western Australia
 Araneus nephelodes (Thorell, 1890) — Indonesia
 Araneus nidus Yin & Gong, 1996 — China
 Araneus nigmanni (Strand, 1906) — Cameroon
 Araneus nigricaudus Simon, 1897 — Vietnam
 Araneus nigrodecoratus (Strand, 1908) — Togo
 Araneus nigroflavornatus Merian, 1911 — Sulawesi
 Araneus nigromaculatus Schenkel, 1963 — China
 Araneus nigropunctatus (L. Koch, 1871) — Queensland, Tahiti
 Araneus nigroquadratus Lawrence, 1937 — South Africa
 Araneus niveus (Hentz, 1847) — USA
 Araneus noegeatus (Thorell, 1895) — Myanmar, Singapore
 Araneus nojimai Tanikawa, 2001 — Japan
 Araneus nordmanni (Thorell, 1870) — Holarctic
 Araneus nossibeus (Strand, 1907) — Madagascar
 Araneus notacephalus (Urquhart, 1891) — Tasmania
 Araneus notandus Rainbow, 1912 — Queensland
 Araneus noumeensis (Simon, 1880) — New Caledonia
 Araneus novaepommerianae (Strand, 1913) — Bismarck Archipel
 Araneus nox (Simon, 1877) — Myanmar, Sumatra, Sulawesi, Philippines, Moluccas
 Araneus nuboso Levi, 1991 — Costa Rica
 Araneus nympha (Simon, 1889) — India, Pakistan, China
 Araneus obscurissimus Caporiacco, 1934 — Karakorum
 Araneus obscurtus (Urquhart, 1893) — Tasmania
 Araneus obtusatus (Karsch, 1891) — Sri Lanka
 Araneus ocaxa Levi, 1991 — Mexico
 Araneus ocellatulus (Roewer, 1942) — Guatemala
 Araneus octodentalis Song & Zhu, 1992 — China
 Araneus octumaculalus Han & Zhu, 2010 — China
 Araneus ogatai Tanikawa, 2001 — Japan
 Araneus omnicolor (Keyserling, 1893) — Brazil, Paraguay, Argentina
 Araneus orgaos Levi, 1991 — Brazil
 Araneus origenus (Thorell, 1890) — Myanmar, Sumatra
 Araneus oxygaster Caporiacco, 1940 — Ethiopia
 Araneus oxyurus (Thorell, 1877) — Myanmar, Sulawesi
 Araneus paenulatus (O. P.-Cambridge, 1885) — Yarkand
 Araneus pahalgaonensis Tikader & Bal, 1981 — India, China
 Araneus pahli (Strand, 1906) — Cameroon
 Araneus paitaensis Schenkel, 1953 — China
 Araneus pallasi (Thorell, 1875) — Turkey, Russia, Ukraine, Central Asia, China
 Araneus pallescens (Lenz, 1891) — Madagascar
 Araneus pallidus (Olivier, 1789) — Portugal, Spain, France, Algeria
 Araneus panchganiensis Tikader & Bal, 1981 — India
 Araneus panniferens (O. P.-Cambridge, 1885) — Yarkand
 Araneus papulatus (Thorell, 1887) — Myanmar, Malaysia
 Araneus partitus (Walckenaer, 1841) — USA
 Araneus parvulus Rainbow, 1900 — New South Wales
 Araneus parvus (Karsch, 1878) — South Australia
 Araneus pauxillus (Thorell, 1887) — Myanmar
 Araneus pavlovi Schenkel, 1953 — China
 Araneus pecuensis (Karsch, 1881) — Russia, China, Japan
 Araneus pegnia (Walckenaer, 1841) — USA to Ecuador and Jamaica
 Araneus pellax (O. P.-Cambridge, 1885) — Yarkand
 Araneus penai Levi, 1991 — Ecuador
 Araneus pentagrammicus (Karsch, 1879) — China, Korea, Taiwan, Japan
 Araneus perincertus Caporiacco, 1947 — Tanzania
 Araneus petersi (Karsch, 1878) — Ethiopia, Mozambique
 Araneus pfeifferae (Thorell, 1877) — Java, Sulawesi
 Araneus phaleratus (Urquhart, 1893) — Tasmania
 Araneus phlyctogena Simon, 1907 — Guinea-Bissau, Bioko, Congo
 Araneus phyllonotus (Thorell, 1887) — Myanmar
 Araneus pichoni Schenkel, 1963 — China
 Araneus pico Levi, 1991 — Brazil
 Araneus pictithorax (Hasselt, 1882) — Sumatra
 Araneus pinguis (Karsch, 1879) — Russia, China, Korea, Japan
 Araneus pistiger Simon, 1899 — Sumatra
 Araneus pius (Karsch, 1878) — New South Wales
 Araneus plenus Yin et al., 2009 — China
 Araneus pogisa (Marples, 1957) — Samoa
 Araneus poltyoides Chrysanthus, 1971 — New Guinea
 Araneus polydentatus Yin, Griswold & Xu, 2007 — China
 Araneus pontii Caporiacco, 1934 — Karakorum
 Araneus popaco Levi, 1991 — Mexico
 Araneus postilena (Thorell, 1878) — Sumatra, Java, Amboina, New Guinea
 Araneus poumotuus (Strand, 1913) — Polynesia
 Araneus praedatus (O. P.-Cambridge, 1885) — Yarkand
 Araneus praesignis (L. Koch, 1872) — Queensland
 Araneus prasius (Thorell, 1890) — Java
 Araneus pratensis (Emerton, 1884) — USA, Canada
 Araneus principis Simon, 1907 — Principe
 Araneus pronubus (Rainbow, 1894) — New South Wales
 Araneus prospiciens (Thorell, 1890) — Sumatra
 Araneus providens Kulczynski, 1911 — New Guinea
 Araneus prunus Levi, 1973 — USA
 Araneus pseudoconicus Schenkel, 1936 — China
 Araneus pseudosturmii Yin et al., 1990 — China
 Araneus pseudoventricosus Schenkel, 1963 — China
 Araneus psittacinus (Keyserling, 1887) — New South Wales, Victoria
 Araneus pudicus (Thorell, 1898) — Myanmar
 Araneus puebla Levi, 1991 — Mexico
 Araneus pulcherrimus (Roewer, 1942) — Europe, Russia
 Araneus pulchriformis (Roewer, 1942) — New South Wales
 Araneus punctipedellus (Strand, 1908) — East Africa
 Araneus pupulus (Thorell, 1890) — Java, Amboina
 Araneus purus (Simon, 1907) — West Africa
 Araneus qianshan Zhu, Zhang & Li, 1998 — China
 Araneus quadratus Clerck, 1757 — Palearctic
 Araneus quietus (Keyserling, 1887) — Australia
 Araneus quirapan Levi, 1991 — Mexico
 Araneus rabiosulus (Keyserling, 1887) — New South Wales
 Araneus radja (Doleschall, 1857) — Amboina, Yule Islands, Aru Islands
 Araneus ragnhildae (Strand, 1917) — Australia
 Araneus rainbowi (Roewer, 1942) — Lord Howe Islands
 Araneus ramulosus (Keyserling, 1887) — Australia
 Araneus rani (Thorell, 1881) — Queensland
 Araneus rarus (Keyserling, 1887) — Queensland, Victoria
 Araneus raui (Strand, 1907) — Cameroon
 Araneus recherchensis (Main, 1954) — Western Australia
 Araneus relicinus (Keyserling, 1887) — Solomon Islands, Bismarck Archipel
 Araneus repetecus Bakhvalov, 1978 — Turkmenistan
 Araneus riveti Berland, 1913 — Ecuador
 Araneus roseomaculatus Ono, 1992 — Taiwan
 Araneus rotundicornis Yaginuma, 1972 — Korea, Japan
 Araneus rotundulus (Keyserling, 1887) — Queensland
 Araneus royi Roewer, 1961 — Senegal
 Araneus rubicundulus (Keyserling, 1887) — New South Wales
 Araneus rubrivitticeps (Strand, 1911) — Aru Islands
 Araneus rufipes (O. P.-Cambridge, 1889) — Guatemala
 Araneus russicus Bakhvalov, 1981 — Russia
 Araneus ryukyuanus Tanikawa, 2001 — Japan
 Araneus saccalava (Strand, 1907) — Madagascar
 Araneus saevus (L. Koch, 1872) — Holarctic
 Araneus sagicola (Dönitz & Strand, 1906) — Japan
 Araneus salto Levi, 1991 — Mexico
 Araneus sambava (Strand, 1907) — Madagascar, Yemen
 Araneus santacruziensis Barrion & Litsinger, 1995 — Philippines
 Araneus santarita (Archer, 1951) — USA
 Araneus savesi (Simon, 1880) — New Caledonia
 Araneus schneblei Levi, 1991 — Colombia
 Araneus schrencki (Grube, 1861) — Russia
 Araneus scutellatus Schenkel, 1963 — China
 Araneus scutifer (Keyserling, 1886) — New South Wales
 Araneus scutigerens Hogg, 1900 — Victoria
 Araneus selva Levi, 1991 — Guatemala to Costa Rica
 Araneus seminiger (L. Koch, 1878) — Korea, Japan
 Araneus senicaudatus Simon, 1908 — Western Australia
 Araneus senicaudatus simplex Simon, 1908 — Western Australia
 Araneus separatus (Roewer, 1942) — New South Wales
 Araneus septemtuberculatus (Thorell, 1899) — Cameroon
 Araneus sernai Levi, 1991 — Colombia
 Araneus shunhuangensis Yin et al., 1990 — China
 Araneus sicki Levi, 1991 — Brazil
 Araneus simillimus Kulczynski, 1911 — New Guinea
 Araneus singularis (Urquhart, 1891) — Tasmania
 Araneus sinistrellus (Roewer, 1942) — Mexico
 Araneus sogdianus Charitonov, 1969 — Central Asia
 Araneus spathurus (Thorell, 1890) — Sumatra
 Araneus speculabundus (L. Koch, 1871) — Australia, Samoa
 Araneus sponsus (Thorell, 1887) — India
 Araneus squamifer (Keyserling, 1886) — Queensland
 Araneus stabilis (Keyserling, 1892) — Brazil, Argentina
 Araneus stella (Karsch, 1879) — Russia, China, Korea, Japan
 Araneus stolidus (Keyserling, 1887) — New South Wales
 Araneus strandiellus Charitonov, 1951 — Russia, Central Asia
 Araneus striatipes (Simon, 1877) — Philippines
 Araneus strigatellus (Strand, 1908) — East Africa
 Araneus strupifer (Simon, 1886) — Tropical Africa
 Araneus sturmi (Hahn, 1831) — Palearctic
 Araneus suavis Rainbow, 1899 — New Hebrides
 Araneus subflavidus (Urquhart, 1893) — Tasmania
 Araneus subumbrosus Roewer, 1961 — Senegal
 Araneus sulfurinus (Pavesi, 1883) — Ethiopia, East Africa
 Araneus svanetiensis Mcheidze, 1997 — Georgia
 Araneus sydneyicus (Keyserling, 1887) — New South Wales, Victoria
 Araneus sylvicola (Rainbow, 1897) — New South Wales
 Araneus taigunensis Zhu, Tu & Hu, 1988 — China
 Araneus talasi Bakhvalov, 1970 — Kyrgyzstan
 Araneus talca Levi, 1991 — Chile, Argentina
 Araneus talipedatus (Keyserling, 1887) — Australia
 Araneus tambopata Levi, 1991 — Peru
 Araneus tamerlani (Roewer, 1942) — Queensland
 Araneus taperae (Mello-Leitao, 1937) — Ecuador to Suriname
 Araneus tartaricus (Kroneberg, 1875) — Central Asia to Korea
 Araneus tatianae Lessert, 1938 — Congo
 Araneus tatsulokeus Barrion & Litsinger, 1995 — Philippines
 Araneus tellezi Levi, 1991 — Mexico
 Araneus tenancingo Levi, 1991 — Mexico
 Araneus tenerius Yin et al., 1990 — China
 Araneus tengxianensis Zhu & Zhang, 1994 — China
 Araneus tepic Levi, 1991 — Mexico
 Araneus tetraspinulus (Yin et al., 1990) — China
 Araneus texanus (Archer, 1951) — USA
 Araneus thaddeus (Hentz, 1847) — North America
 Araneus thevenoti Simon, 1895 — Zanzibar
 Araneus thorelli (Roewer, 1942) — Myanmar
 Araneus tiganus (Chamberlin, 1916) — Ecuador, Peru
 Araneus tijuca Levi, 1991 — Brazil
 Araneus tinikdikitus Barrion & Litsinger, 1995 — Philippines
 Araneus titirus Simon, 1896 — Chile, Argentina
 Araneus toma (Strand, 1915) — Bismarck Archipel
 Araneus tonkinus Simon, 1909 — Vietnam
 Araneus toruaigiri Bakhvalov, 1970 — Kyrgyzstan
 Araneus transversivittiger (Strand, 1907) — China
 Araneus transversus Rainbow, 1912 — Queensland
 Araneus triangulus (Fox, 1938) — China
 Araneus tricoloratus Zhu, Tu & Hu, 1988 — China
 Araneus trifolium (Hentz, 1847) — USA, Canada, Alaska
 Araneus trigonophorus (Thorell, 1887) — Myanmar
 Araneus triguttatus (Fabricius, 1793) — Palearctic
 Araneus tschuiskii Bakhvalov, 1974 — Kyrgyzstan
 Araneus tsurusakii Tanikawa, 2001 — Japan
 Araneus tubabdominus Zhu & Zhang, 1993 — China
 Araneus tuscarora Levi, 1973 — USA
 Araneus ubicki Levi, 1991 — Costa Rica
 Araneus unanimus (Keyserling, 1879) — Brazil, Paraguay, Argentina
 Araneus uniformis (Keyserling, 1879) — Bolivia to Argentina and Brazil
 Araneus unistriatus (McCook, 1894) — probably Brazil
 Araneus urbanus (Keyserling, 1887) — New South Wales
 Araneus urquharti (Roewer, 1942) — New South Wales
 Araneus ursimorphus (Strand, 1906) — Ethiopia, East Africa
 Araneus uruapan Levi, 1991 — Mexico
 Araneus urubamba Levi, 1991 — Peru
 Araneus usualis (Keyserling, 1887) — Queensland, New South Wales
 Araneus uyemurai Yaginuma, 1960 — Russia, Korea, Japan
 Araneus v-notatus (Thorell, 1875) — France, Algeria
 Araneus variegatus Yaginuma, 1960 — Russia, China, Korea, Japan
 Araneus varpunen Sen, Dhali, Saha & Raychaudhuri, 2015 -  India 
 Araneus venatrix (C. L. Koch, 1838) — Panama and Trinidad to Paraguay
 Araneus ventricosus (L. Koch, 1878) — Russia, China, Korea, Taiwan, Japan
 Araneus ventricosus abikonus Uyemura, 1961 — Japan
 Araneus ventricosus globulus Uyemura, 1961 — Japan
 Araneus ventricosus hakonensis Uyemura, 1961 — Japan
 Araneus ventricosus ishinodai Uyemura, 1961 — Japan
 Araneus ventricosus kishuensis Uyemura, 1961 — Japan
 Araneus ventricosus montanioides Uyemura, 1961 — Japan
 Araneus ventricosus montanus Uyemura, 1961 — Japan
 Araneus ventricosus nigelloides Uyemura, 1961 — Japan
 Araneus ventricosus nigellus Uyemura, 1961 — Japan
 Araneus ventricosus yaginumai Uyemura, 1961 — Japan
 Araneus ventriosus (Urquhart, 1891) — Tasmania
 Araneus vermimaculatus Zhu & Wang, 1994 — China
 Araneus villa Levi, 1991 — Bolivia
 Araneus vincibilis (Keyserling, 1893) — Brazil, Paraguay, Argentina
 Araneus viperifer Schenkel, 1963 — China, Korea, Japan
 Araneus virgunculus (Thorell, 1890) — Sumatra
 Araneus virgus (Fox, 1938) — China
 Araneus viridisomus (Gravely, 1921) — India
 Araneus viridiventris Yaginuma, 1969 — China, Taiwan, Japan
 Araneus viridulus (Urquhart, 1891) — Tasmania
 Araneus volgeri Simon, 1897 — Zanzibar
 Araneus vulpinus (Hahn, 1834) — Southern Europe
 Araneus vulvarius (Thorell, 1898) — Myanmar
 Araneus walesianus (Karsch, 1878) — New South Wales
 Araneus washingtoni Levi, 1971 — Russia, USA, Canada
 Araneus wokamus (Strand, 1911) — Aru Islands
 Araneus woodfordi Pocock, 1898 — Solomon Islands
 Araneus workmani (Keyserling, 1884) — Brazil, Argentina
 Araneus wulongensis Song & Zhu, 1992 — China
 Araneus xavantina Levi, 1991 — Brazil
 Araneus xianfengensis Song & Zhu, 1992 — China
 Araneus xizangensis Hu, 2001 — China
 Araneus yadongensis Hu, 2001 — China
 Araneus yapingensis Yin et al., 2009 — China
 Araneus yasudai Tanikawa, 2001 — Russia, Japan
 Araneus yatei Berland, 1924 — New Caledonia
 Araneus yoshitomii Yoshida, 2014 - Ogasawara Is. 
 Araneus yuanminensis Yin et al., 1990 — China
 Araneus yukon Levi, 1971 — Russia, Canada
 Araneus yunnanensis Yin, Peng & Wang, 1994 — China
 Araneus yuzhongensis Yin et al., 1990 — China
 Araneus zapallar Levi, 1991 — Chile
 Araneus zebrinus Zhu & Wang, 1994 — China
 Araneus zelus (Strand, 1907) — Cameroon
 Araneus zhangmu Zhang, Song & Kim, 2006 — China
 Araneus zhaoi Zhang & Zhang, 2002 — China
 Araneus zuluanus (Strand, 1907) — South Africa
 Araneus zygielloides Schenkel, 1963 — China

Araniella
Araniella Chamberlin & Ivie, 1942
 Araniella alpica (L. Koch, 1869) — Europe to Azerbaijan
 Araniella coreana Namkung, 2002 — Korea
 Araniella cucurbitina (Clerck, 1757) — Palearctic
 Araniella displicata (Hentz, 1847) (type species) — Holarctic
 Araniella inconspicua (Simon, 1874) — Palearctic
 Araniella jilinensis Yin & Zhu, 1994 — China
 Araniella maderiana (Kulczynski, 1905) — Canary Islands, Madeira
 Araniella opisthographa (Kulczynski, 1905) — Europe to Central Asia
 Araniella plicata Mi & Peng, 2016 -  China 
 Araniella proxima (Kulczynski, 1885) — Holarctic
 Araniella tbilisiensis (Mcheidze, 1997) — Georgia
 Araniella yaginumai Tanikawa, 1995 — Russia, Korea, China, Taiwan, Japan

Aranoethra
Aranoethra Butler, 1873
 Aranoethra butleri Pocock, 1899 — West Africa
 Aranoethra cambridgei (Butler, 1873) (type species) — West, Central Africa
 Aranoethra ungari Karsch, 1878 — West Africa

Argiope
Argiope Audouin, 1826
 Argiope abramovi Logunov & Jäger, 2015 - Vietnam 
 Argiope aemula (Walckenaer, 1841) — India to Philippines, Sulawesi, New Hebrides
 Argiope aetherea (Walckenaer, 1841) — China to Australia
 Argiope aetheroides Yin et al., 1989 — China, Japan
 Argiope ahngeri Spassky, 1932 — Central Asia
 Argiope amoena L. Koch, 1878 — China, Korea, Taiwan, Japan
 Argiope anasuja Thorell, 1887 — Seychelles to India, Pakistan, Maldives
 Argiope anomalopalpis Bjørn, 1997 — Congo, South Africa
 Argiope appensa (Walckenaer, 1841) — Hawaii, Taiwan to New Guinea
 Argiope argentata (Fabricius, 1775) — USA to Chile
 Argiope aurantia Lucas, 1833 — Canada to Costa Rica
 Argiope aurocincta Pocock, 1898 — Central, East, Southern Africa
 Argiope australis (Walckenaer, 1805) — Central, East, Southern Africa, Cape Verde Islands
 Argiope bivittigera Strand, 1911 — Indonesia
 Argiope blanda O. P.-Cambridge, 1898 — USA to Costa Rica
 Argiope boesenbergi Levi, 1983 — China, Korea, Japan
 Argiope bougainvilla (Walckenaer, 1847) — New Guinea to Solomon Islands
 Argiope bruennichi (Scopoli, 1772) — Palearctic
 Argiope brunnescentia Strand, 1911 — New Guinea, Bismarck Archipel
 Argiope buehleri Schenkel, 1944 — Timor
 Argiope bullocki Rainbow, 1908 — New South Wales
 Argiope butchko LeQuier & Agnarsson, 2016 - Cuba
 Argiope caesarea Thorell, 1897 — India, Myanmar, China
 Argiope caledonia Levi, 1983 — New Caledonia, New Hebrides
 Argiope cameloides Zhu & Song, 1994 — China
 Argiope catenulata (Doleschall, 1859) — India to Philippines, New Guinea
 Argiope chloreis Thorell, 1877 — Laos, Sumatra to New Guinea
 Argiope comorica Bjørn, 1997 — Comoro Islands
 Argiope coquereli (Vinson, 1863) — Zanzibar, Madagascar
 Argiope dang Jäger & Praxaysombath, 2009 — Thailand, Laos
 Argiope dietrichae Levi, 1983 — Western Australia, Northern Australia
 Argiope doboensis Strand, 1911 — Indonesia, New Guinea
 Argiope doleschalli Thorell, 1873 — Indonesia
 Argiope ericae Levi, 2004 — Brazil, Argentina
 Argiope flavipalpis (Lucas, 1858) — Africa, Yemen
 Argiope florida Chamberlin & Ivie, 1944 — USA
 Argiope halmaherensis Strand, 1907 — Moluccas to New Guinea
 Argiope hinderlichi Jäger, 2012 — Laos
 Argiope intricata Simon, 1877 — Philippines
 Argiope jinghongensis Yin, Peng & Wang, 1994 — China, Laos, Thailand
 Argiope kaingang Corronca & Rodríguez-Artigas, 2015 - Argentina 
 Argiope katherina Levi, 1983 — Northern Australia
 Argiope keyserlingi Karsch, 1878 — Queensland, New South Wales, Lord Howe Islands
 Argiope kochi Levi, 1983 — Queensland
 Argiope legionis Motta & Levi, 2009 — Brazil
 Argiope levii Bjørn, 1997 — Kenya, Tanzania
 Argiope lobata (Pallas, 1772) type species — Old World
 Argiope luzona (Walckenaer, 1841) — Philippines
 Argiope macrochoera Thorell, 1891 — Nicobar Islands, China
 Argiope madang Levi, 1984 — New Guinea
 Argiope magnifica L. Koch, 1871 — Queensland to Solomon Islands
 Argiope mangal Koh, 1991 — Singapore
 Argiope manila Levi, 1983 — Philippines
 Argiope mascordi Levi, 1983 — Queensland
 Argiope minuta Karsch, 1879 — Bangladesh, East Asia
 Argiope modesta Thorell, 1881 — Borneo to Australia
 Argiope niasensis Strand, 1907 — Indonesia
 Argiope ocula Fox, 1938 — China, Taiwan, Japan
 Argiope ocyaloides L. Koch, 1871 — Queensland
 Argiope pentagona L. Koch, 1871 — Fiji
 Argiope perforata Schenkel, 1963 — China
 Argiope picta L. Koch, 1871 — Moluccas to Australia
 Argiope pictula Strand, 1911 — Sulawesi
 Argiope ponape Levi, 1983 — Caroline Islands
 Argiope possoica Merian, 1911 — Sulawesi
 Argiope probata Rainbow, 1916 — Queensland
 Argiope protensa L. Koch, 1872 — New Guinea, Australia, New Caledonia, New Zealand
 Argiope pulchella Thorell, 1881 — India to China and Indonesia
 Argiope pulchelloides Yin et al., 1989 — China
 Argiope radon Levi, 1983 — Northern Australia
 Argiope ranomafanensis Bjørn, 1997 — Madagascar
 Argiope reinwardti (Doleschall, 1859) — Malaysia to New Guinea
 Argiope reinwardti sumatrana (Hasselt, 1882) — Sumatra
 Argiope sapoa Barrion & Litsinger, 1995 — Philippines
 Argiope sector (Forsskal, 1776) — North Africa, Middle East, Cape Verde Islands
 Argiope squallica Strand, 1915 — New Guinea
 Argiope submaronica Strand, 1916 — Mexico to Bolivia, Brazil
 Argiope takum Chrysanthus, 1971 — New Guinea
 Argiope tapinolobata Bjørn, 1997 — Senegal, Namibia
 Argiope taprobanica Thorell, 1887 — Sri Lanka
 Argiope trifasciata (Forsskal, 1775) — Cosmopolitan
 Argiope trifasciata deserticola Simon, 1906 — Sudan
 Argiope trifasciata kauaiensis Simon, 1900 — Hawaii
 Argiope truk Levi, 1983 — Caroline Islands
 Argiope versicolor (Doleschall, 1859) — China to Java
 Argiope vietnamensis Ono, 2010 — Vietnam

Arkys
Arkys Walckenaer, 1837
 Arkys alatus Keyserling, 1890 — Queensland, New South Wales
 Arkys alticephala (Urquhart, 1891) — Southern Australia
 Arkys brevipalpus Karsch, 1878 — New Caledonia
 Arkys bulburinensis Heimer, 1984 — Queensland, New South Wales
 Arkys cicatricosus (Rainbow, 1920) — Lord Howe Islands
 Arkys cornutus L. Koch, 1872 — New Guinea, Queensland
 Arkys coronatus (Balogh, 1978) — New Guinea
 Arkys curtulus (Simon, 1903) — Eastern Australia
 Arkys dilatatus (Balogh, 1978) — Queensland
 Arkys furcatus (Balogh, 1978) — Queensland
 Arkys gracilis Heimer, 1984 — Queensland
 Arkys grandis (Balogh, 1978) — New Caledonia
 Arkys hickmani Heimer, 1984 — Tasmania
 Arkys kaszabi (Balogh, 1978) — New Guinea
 Arkys lancearius Walckenaer, 1837 (type species) — New Guinea to New South Wales
 Arkys latissimus (Balogh, 1982) — Queensland
 Arkys montanus (Balogh, 1978) — New Guinea
 Arkys multituberculatus (Balogh, 1982) — Queensland
 Arkys nimdol Chrysanthus, 1971 — New Guinea
 Arkys occidentalis (Reimoser, 1936) — Buru Islands
 Arkys roosdorpi (Chrysanthus, 1971) — New Guinea
 Arkys semicirculatus (Balogh, 1982) — Queensland
 Arkys sibil (Chrysanthus, 1971) — New Guinea
 Arkys soosi (Balogh, 1982) — New Guinea
 Arkys speechleyi (Mascord, 1968) — New South Wales
 Arkys toxopeusi (Reimoser, 1936) — Buru Islands
 Arkys transversus (Balogh, 1978) — New South Wales
 Arkys tuberculatus (Balogh, 1978) — Queensland
 Arkys varians (Balogh, 1978) — New Caledonia
 Arkys vicarius (Balogh, 1978) — New Caledonia
 Arkys walckenaeri Simon, 1879 — Australia, Tasmania

Artonis
Artonis Simon, 1895
 Artonis bituberculata (Thorell, 1895) (type species) — Myanmar
 Artonis gallana (Pavesi, 1895) — Ethiopia

Aspidolasius
Aspidolasius Simon, 1887
 Aspidolasius branicki (Taczanowski, 1879) — Colombia to Bolivia, Guyana, Brazil

Augusta
Augusta O. P.-Cambridge, 1877
 Augusta glyphica (Guerin, 1839) — Madagascar

Austracantha
Austracantha Dahl, 1914
 Austracantha minax (Thorell, 1859) — Australia, Tasmania
 Austracantha minax astrigera (L. Koch, 1871) — Australia
 Austracantha minax hermitis (Hogg, 1914) — Montebello Islands
 Austracantha minax leonhardii (Strand, 1913) — Australia
 Austracantha minax lugubris (L. Koch, 1871) — Australia

References
  (2014): The world spider catalog, version 17.5. American Museum of Natural History. 

Lists of spider species by family